Maria Skobtsova (20 [8 Old Calendar] December 1891 – 31 March 1945), known as Mother Maria, Saint Mary (or Mother Maria) of Paris, born Elizaveta Yurievna Pilenko, Kuzmina-Karavayeva by her first marriage, Skobtsova by her second marriage, was a Russian noblewoman, poet, nun, and member of the French Resistance during World War II. She has been canonized a saint in the Eastern Orthodox Church.

Life

Born to an aristocratic family in 1891 in Riga, Russian Empire (now Latvia).  She was given the name Elizaveta Pilenko. Her father died when she was a teenager, and she embraced atheism. In 1906 her mother moved the family to St. Petersburg, where she became involved in radical intellectual circles. In 1910, she married a Bolshevik by the name of Dmitriy Kuz'min-Karavaev. During this period of her life she was actively involved in literary circles and wrote much poetry. Her first book, Scythian Shards (Скифские черепки), was a collection of poetry from this period. By 1913, her marriage to Dimitriy had ended. He  subsequently converted to Catholicism and became a  Catholic priest.

Through a look at the humanity of Christ — "He also died. He sweated blood. They struck his face" — she began to be drawn back into Christianity. She moved—now with her daughter, Gaiana — to the south of Russia where her religious devotion increased. Furious at Leon Trotsky for closing the Socialist-Revolutionary Party Congress, she planned his assassination, but was dissuaded by colleagues, who sent her to Anapa.
In 1918, after the Bolshevik Revolution, she was elected deputy mayor of Anapa in Southern Russia. When the anti-communist White Army took control of Anapa, the mayor fled and she became mayor of the town. The White Army put her on trial for being a Bolshevik. However, the judge was a former teacher of hers, Daniil Skobtsov, and she was acquitted. Soon the two fell in love and were married.

Soon, the political tide was turning again. In order to avoid danger, Elizaveta, Daniil, Gaiana, and Elizaveta's mother Sophia fled the country. Elizaveta was pregnant with her second child. They traveled first to Georgia (where her son Yuri was born) and then to Yugoslavia (where her daughter Anastasia was born). Finally they arrived in Paris in 1923. Soon Elizaveta was dedicating herself to theological studies and social work. In 1926, Anastasia died of influenza. Gaiana was sent away to Belgium to boarding school. Soon, Daniil and Elizaveta's marriage was falling apart. Yuri ended up living with Daniil, and Elizaveta moved into central Paris to work more directly with those who were most in need.

Her bishop encouraged her to take vows as a nun, something she did only with the assurance that she would not have to live in a monastery, secluded from the world. In 1932, with Daniil Skobtov's permission, an ecclesiastical divorce was granted, and she took monastic vows. She took the religious name "Maria". Her confessor was Father Sergei Bulgakov. Later, Fr. Dmitri Klepinin would be sent to be the chaplain of the house.

Mother Maria made a rented house in Paris her "convent". It was a place with an open door for refugees, the needy and the lonely. It also soon became a center for intellectual and theological discussion. In Mother Maria these two elements  —  service to the poor and theology  —  went hand-in-hand.

Death
After the Fall of France in 1940, Jews began approaching the house asking for baptismal certificates, which Father Dimitri would provide them. Many Jews came to stay with them. They provided shelter and helped many to flee the country. Eventually the house was closed down. Mother Maria, Fr. Dimitri, Yuri and Sophia were all arrested by the Gestapo. Fr. Dimitri and Yuri both died at the Dora concentration camp.

Mother Maria was sent to the Ravensbrück concentration camp. On Holy Saturday, 1945, she was sent to the gas chamber.

Canonization
Mother Maria was glorified (canonized a saint) by act of the Holy Synod of the Ecumenical Patriarchate on 16 January 2004. The glorification of Mother Maria, together with Fr. Dimitri, Yuri, and Ilya Fondaminsky took place at the Cathedral of Saint Alexander Nevsky in Paris on 1 and 2 May 2004. Their feast day is 20 July.

Legacy
On June 24, 2020, a memorial plaque to Skobtsova was unveiled at the famous Sainte Genevieve de Bois cemetery, on the territory of the Russian necropolis.

Skobtsova is also commemorated in the American Episcopal Church's calendar, with a lesser feast on July 21.

Mother Maria was designated as Righteous among the Nations at Yad Vashem in Israel.

Example of poetry
In July, 1942, when the order requiring Jews to wear the yellow star was published, she wrote a poem entitled "Israel":

Two triangles, a star,
The shield of King David, our forefather.
This is election, not offense.
The great path and not an evil.
Once more in a term fulfilled,
Once more roars the trumpet of the end;
And the fate of a great people
Once more is by the prophet proclaimed.
Thou art persecuted again, O Israel,
But what can human malice mean to thee,
who have heard the thunder from Sinai?

Publications

References

Sources

Biographies

External links
Maria Skobtsova, orthodoxwiki.org. Accessed 7 December 2022.
Maria Skobtsova – her activity to save Jews' lives during the Holocaust, at Yad Vashem website

1891 births
1945 deaths
French Resistance members
Socialist Revolutionary Party politicians
20th-century Eastern Orthodox nuns
Women poets from the Russian Empire
Russian Empire saints
Nuns from the Russian Empire
Women mayors of places in Russia
Eastern Orthodox Righteous Among the Nations
Eastern Orthodox Christians from France
French people who died in Ravensbrück concentration camp
20th-century Christian saints
Female anti-fascists
Old Bolsheviks
Nobility from Riga
Soviet civilians killed in World War II
20th-century Eastern Orthodox martyrs
People killed by gas chamber by Nazi Germany
Soviet people who died in Nazi concentration camps
Christian female saints of the Late Modern era
20th-century Russian poets
Emigrants from the Russian Empire to France
Eastern Orthodox socialists
Christian socialists from the Russian Empire
Female resistance members of World War II
Female Christian socialists
20th-century French women